Luiza Nikolayevna Noskova (born 7 July 1968 in Labytnangi) is a Russian biathlete. At the 1994 Winter Olympics in Lillehammer, she won a gold medal with the Russian relay team.

References

1968 births
Living people
Russian female biathletes
Olympic biathletes of Russia
Biathletes at the 1994 Winter Olympics
Olympic gold medalists for Russia
People from Yamalo-Nenets Autonomous Okrug
Olympic medalists in biathlon
Medalists at the 1994 Winter Olympics
Sportspeople from Yamalo-Nenets Autonomous Okrug
20th-century Russian women
21st-century Russian women